Salud ("health" in Spanish) may refer to:

People
Salud Algabre (1894—1979), Filipina revolutionary 
Salud Carbajal (born 1964), American politician serving as U.S. Representative for California
Salud (surname), a surname

Places
Salud, Colón, Panama

Film and TV
Salud (film), film by MEDICC on the Cuban health service
Salud (Breaking Bad)

Music

Albums
Salud, album by Juan d'Anyelica
¡Salud! João Gilberto, Originator of the Bossa Nova 1963 studio album by Jon Hendricks
Salud, Dinero y Dinero, Trotsky Vengaran album 1991
Calle Salud, Compay Segundo 1999
Salud y Buenos Alimentos, Rosendo Mercado 2005
Salud Universal, Los Brujos
A Tu Salud, Vicente Fernández 1998
A Su Salud..., Grupo Bryndis 1996
Salud Y Rocanrol, Barricada 1997

Songs
"Salud", by George Shearing Quintet
"Salud", song by RJD2 from Deadringer (album)
"Salud", song by Sky Blu (rapper) Reek Rude / Sensato / Sky Blu / Wilmer Valderrama
Salud Part 2, Wilmer Valderrama
"Salud" by Larry Carlton, composed by Abraham Laboriel, Sr.
"Salud" by Vicente Fernández, composed by Homero Aguilar
"Salud" by Armando Manzanero, composed by Armando Manzanero covered by José Feliciano